The Tren del Sur (Train of the South) is a planned railway line on the island of Tenerife, Canary Islands, linking the capital Santa Cruz de Tenerife with the south of the island via Tenerife South Airport.

Background

Originally, detailed planning was to begin in 2010 with the line expected to fully open in 2018. However, in 2011 the plans were indefinitely postponed for economic reasons. In 2017 the plan was reactivated. The line is planned for an end-to-end journey time of 42 minutes, running at 15-minute intervals, carrying up to 64,000 passengers daily.

Cost
In 2010 the estimated cost of the line was €1.8 billion, with the Ministry of Development allocating €5 million to the Cabildo de Tenerife to plan its construction.

Route
The proposed route of 80 km will contain 7 railway stations with a possible extension to Fonsalía, but starting from Santa Cruz de Tenerife to Costa Adeje, with the journey taking approximately 42 minutes. Stations will be located in:

Santa Cruz de Tenerife
Añaza
Candelaria
San Isidro
Tenerife South Airport
Los Cristianos
Playa de las Américas

Tren del Norte 
Along with the Tren del Sur plan, the Cabildo de Tenerife is studying a rail line linking northern towns on the island.

References

Proposed railway lines in Spain
Proposed rail infrastructure in Spain
Transport in Tenerife